The Common Linnets is the self-titled debut studio album by Dutch band The Common Linnets. The album was released on 9 May 2014 through Universal Music Group. The lead single, "Calm After the Storm", was released on 14 March 2014.

Singles
"Calm After the Storm" was released as the lead single from the album on 14 March 2014. The song was chosen through an internal selection to represent the Netherlands at the Eurovision Song Contest 2014 in Copenhagen, Denmark. In the first semi-final the producers of the show decided that the Netherlands would perform 14th, the song qualified from the first semi-final and competed in the final on 10 May 2014. "Give Me a Reason" was released as the second single from the album on 11 September 2014.

Reception

Critical reception
The album received generally positive reviews from music critics. NU.nl gave the album a positive review stating, "At the turning of the tide, the duo finished their first (and possibly only) album. On their self-titled record, the two musicians explore their love of country and folk further than they have done previously, often successfully. This is thanks to the collaboration with Daniel Lohues, JB Meijers and musicians from Nashville. Especially lovers of World Of Hurt, the highly successful debut of DeLange, will be pleased with traditional country songs like Still Loving After You, Hungry Hands, Sun Song and Broken But Home. The quiver in DeLange's voice has returned and mixes well with Waylon's timbre. With Time Has No Mercy, Arms Of Salvation and Lovers & Liars, the duo delivers upbeat songs, while Before Complete Surrender, sounding like a Carpenters song, shows a more sensitive side, as well as the Waylon Jennings and Johnny Cash inspired Where Do I Go With Me, and DeLange's tribute to her father, Love Goes On. The soulful edge of Waylon's voice is rarely heard on this album, but it can be heard on the western song When Love Was King. Perhaps the two have to consider whether there is more future for The Common Linnets, because this is the best album in years for both artists." De Volkskrant also gave the album a positive review, stating, "The duo's success at the Eurovision Song Contest on Saturday isn't the only proof that their formation was a masterstroke. Even though Calm After the Storm is without a doubt one of the most beautiful songs on their debut album, titled The Common Linnets, the duo show that they can produce a lot more gems. However, none of them share the aforementioned song's atmosphere, reminiscent of Robert Plant and Alison Krauss. Instead, traditional country and other americana styles prevail on this surprisingly strong album. On Still Loving After You, written with Daniel Lohues, Ilse DeLange sings again with a broken country heart, which she has showcased on too few occasions. And on Where Do I Go With Me, Waylon shows how well versed he is in the repertoire of George Jones. With the help of Lohues and JB Meijers (producer and composer), both Waylon and DeLange have been able to outdo themselves on this beautiful country album. It leaves us wanting more."

Commercial performance
On 17 May 2014 the album entered the Dutch Albums Chart at number 1. On 14 May 2014 the album was at number 27 on The Official Chart Update in the UK. On 15 May 2014 the album entered the Irish Albums Chart at number 45.
On 28 July 2014, the official Facebook of the band, confirmed that the album sold over 150,000 copies of their debut album.

Track listing

Personnel
 Ilse DeLange – mandolin, background vocals
 Jerry Douglas – resonator guitar 
 Shannon Forrest – drums, percussion
 Larry Franklin – fiddle
 Paul Franklin – pedal steel guitar
 JB Meijers – piano, mandolin, lap steel guitar, guitar, bass, banjo, background vocals
 Metropole Orchestra – strings
 Jimmy Nichols – piano
 Michael Rhodes – bass
 Adam Schoenfeld – guitar
 Ilya Toshinsky – mandolin, guitar, banjo
 Bart Vergoossen – drums, percussion

Chart performance

Weekly charts

Year-end charts

Certifications

Release history

References

2014 debut albums
The Common Linnets albums
Universal Music Netherlands albums
Country folk albums
European Border Breakers Award-winning albums